Docohamus orientalis is a species of beetle in the family Cerambycidae. It was described by Stephan von Breuning in 1986. It is known from Tanzania and Kenya.

References

Lamiini
Beetles described in 1986